Saul of the Mole Men is an American live-action/puppet/animated hybrid comedy television series created by Craig Lewis, former writer on Cartoon Network's The Grim Adventures of Billy and Mandy and Foster's Home for Imaginary Friends. The series first aired on the channel's late night Adult Swim programming block on February 11, 2007. Described as "an ultra-patriotic Land of the Lost set in the center of the Earth", the series was directed by Tom Stern and stars Josh Gardner, who previously collaborated with Stern on the television series Gerhard Reinke's Wanderlust. Its theme song is performed by South Park co-creator Trey Parker.

Lewis' primary inspirations behind this homage to 1970s-era Saturday morning live-action television were Sid and Marty Krofft (Land of the Lost), Doctor Who (Tom Baker-era), and the Planet of the Apes franchise. On October 31, 2008, Adult Swim ran a special Halloween marathon consisting only of cancelled shows, featuring Saul of the Mole Men, thus confirming its cancellation.

Plot
A series promo featured brief introductions for the crew on the use of a subterranean drill module. The team, known as STRATA, included Captain Jim J. James, Lieutenant Jen E. James, Robot, Kiko the Mute Wildboy, and the "rest" of the STRATA action team, which included Saul Malone (Gardner) – and Don Rogers. The main character, Saul, is seen in the background or blocked off by objects like a shovel or a flag during the promo.

Following the promo, the crew is shown aboard STRATA's huge ship, which is burrowing deep under Earth's surface. Saul becomes the sole survivor of the main team when rocks begin pummeling the rest of the STRATA team, and crippling their ship; the only other survivors are a Robot controlled by a human brain, and the vapid pop musician Johnny Tambourine, who is conscious but trapped in a hibernation capsule. Saul soon finds himself in an underground world populated by "Mole Men" and "Bird Bats" as well as unexplained characters like "The Floating Pancake" and "Chinacula", a cape-wearing Chinese vampire. Though cut off from the surface world, Saul is elated, believing he will find evidence beneath the surface for his theory that there are sentient rocks descended from a huge "mother rock". Terrified by the Mole Men, Saul impulsively impales their king using the STRATA transmitter. The king eventually dies, touching off a power struggle between his two sons – the older (but corpulent and corrupt) Bertrum Burrows, and the noble Clancy Burrows. Saul fails to get a proper signal to STRATA before the transmitter is destroyed. However, he does meet a talking rock, one he believes to be the Mother Rock. The intelligent stone inspires Saul to lead the Mole Men, who themselves are turning to a popular vote in search of a new king. Saul is easily defeated by both of the Burrows brothers, who themselves lose to a clueless Johnny Tambourine.

As the series progresses, Saul is alternately challenged and befriended by Mole Men. Saul meets Fallopia, a female and one of the most horribly mutated of the Mole Men (when revealed, she actually appears to be a beautiful human woman). Though Fallopia becomes Saul's love interest, she betrays him when found in flagrante delicto with Johnny Tambourine. Eventually the plot links the Mother Rock, a war between mole men and bird bats and a prophecy involving magical gemstones, the end of the world and Benjamin Franklin.

In the season 1 finale, Saul, Clancy, and Stromulus Guandor team up to defeat the Rock Assassins, which are actually Jim J. James and Jen. E. James' bodies with rock heads, who then combine to form a giant rock monster. With the combined talents of Stromulus' "Sonar of the Bird-Bats", Bertrum's"Mole Man Burrowing", and Saul's "Rock Master Tumble", they defeat the rock monster, and Saul's old captains die in peace — only for Saul to confront Nathaniel Baltimore — his arch rival from the Tallahassee Geological License Review Board — who inexplicably appears. Suddenly, they find a spaceship, and everybody, including the floating pancake, clambers on. Clancy even allows Bertrum aboard, though how he survived the rock attack in the previous episode is never explained. Before they take off, Otnip – the moss-covered devil of the Mole Men – stops their ship. Clancy goes out in an apparent suicide mission to blow up Otnip and free the ship. The episode ends as the ship flies into outer space, and the team, led by Saul and Fallopia, with Bertrum, Stromulus, Mrs. Burrows, Li'l Burrows, Nathaniel Baltimore, the floating pancake, and Chinacula is renamed "Strata-Team Space". Thus ends the season.

Advertisements began airing on Adult Swim advertising the show as STRATA instead of the original title, making the series appear much like . Subsequent advertisements, however, focus more on Saul and reveal the actual title of the show.

Saul often refers to his home-town of Buffalo, New York and reveals that he studied geology. Saul's presence is largely funny because of his endearing use of Buffalo English. His love interest is introduced as a creature perceived by locals as hideous and nearly beaten to death by the Mole Men. The beating is interrupted and the creature is revealed to be the lovely Fallopia. The Mole Men's perception of Fallopia's appearance is not unlike the Twilight Zone episode "Eye of the Beholder".

Cast
Josh Gardner as Saul Malone and Johnny Tambourine
Frank Potenza as Robot (voice)
Hugh Davidson as Bertrum Burrows (voice)
Jeff Bennett as Clancy Burrows (voice)
Irina Voronina as Fallopia
Dana Snyder as STRATA Operator #1
Gary Anthony Williams as STRATA Operator #2
Arturo Gil as Lil' Lil Burrows
Carlos Alazraqui as Stromulus Guandor the Birdbat Leader (voice)

Episodes

Pilot
A pilot episode for Saul of the Mole Men was produced in 2005 and it was never aired on television. The pilot was released on Adultswim.com, but it has been taken down since.

Season 1 (2007)

International broadcast 
In Canada, Saul of the Mole Men previously aired on Teletoon's Teletoon at Night block, and currently airs on the Canadian version of Adult Swim.

References

External links
 
 
 SuicideGirls – Tom Stern Interview (April 27, 2006)
 SuicideGirls – Marty Krofft Interview (May 23, 2006)
 The Apiary – Jonah Ray Interview (August 23, 2006)
 WizardUniverse.com – ToyFare: Craig Lewis Interview (September 28, 2006)
 Atlanta Journal-Constitution – Gary Anthony Williams Interview (January 16, 2007)

2007 American television series debuts
2007 American television series endings
2000s American comic science fiction television series
Adult Swim original programming
American television series with live action and animation
American television shows featuring puppetry
English-language television shows
Television series by Williams Street